Harry Griesbeck (born 22 August 1946) is a retired German football forward.

References

External links
 

1946 births
Living people
German footballers
2. Bundesliga players
VfL Bochum players
Association football forwards